Mxolisi Siyonzana is a South African politician who has been the Executive Mayor of the Mangaung Metropolitan Municipality in the Free State Province since 16 August 2021. He replaced Olly Mlamleli, who was removed in a motion of no confidence back in August 2020. Siyonzana is a member of the African National Congress and the former speaker of the metropolitan municipality. He has been described as an ally of former Free State premier and current suspended ANC Secretary-General Ace Magashule.

References

Living people
Place of birth missing (living people)
Year of birth missing (living people)
Sotho people
People from Bloemfontein
African National Congress politicians
Mayors of places in South Africa